John W Bartlett was a football manager.

He was manager of Leicester City F.C. from 1912 to the start of World War I in 1914.

References

Leicester City F.C. managers
Year of death missing
Year of birth missing